The Stoppelsberg is a hill in Hesse, Germany.

Mountains of Hesse
Natura 2000 in Germany
Mountains and hills of the Rhön